Combol Island (Indonesian: Pulau Combol, pronounced Chombol, formerly Dutch spelling Tjombol) lies in the Riau Archipelago of the Riau Islands Province of Indonesia.  It is located 20 km SE of Batam, between the islands of Kepala Jernih, Bulan Island, and Sugi Island.  It is separated by the 500 foot wide Mie Strait from Citlim Island.

Riau Archipelago
Landforms of the Riau Islands
Islands of Sumatra